Facer is a community in the city of St. Catharines, Ontario, Canada.  It is located in the North East part of the city, bounded by the Queen Elizabeth Way and Welland Avenue to the South, Grantham Avenue to the East, Carlton Street to the North and Niagara Street to the West, with Facer Street being the main access road through the community.  Facer is home to a vibrant immigrant community dominated by Polish- and Ukrainian-Canadians, with a sizable minority of Italian-Canadians in the east end of the community near Grantham Avenue.  It is one of the few areas outside of the Greater Toronto Area where it is common to see store signs posted in a language other than English, with most stores in the area offering services to customers in their native language.  Facer is home to the Queen Elizabeth Community Centre, St. Joseph's Bakery, the Canadian Polish Society, authentic Italian cafes, credit unions serving the Polish and Ukrainian communities, and a number of churches with bilingual services in a number of different languages.

Neighbourhoods in St. Catharines